Nikolay Nicolaevich Milovidov (born 30 Octoberl 1963) is a Russian documentary film-maker, an author and director of numerous films and telecasts, a laureate of international festivals. His films were shown on Russian television and on the other countries' channels, including BBC. Directed more than 20 films and more than 100 TV programmes. Worked as a reporter, an editor, a film director and a stage director.

Filmography

Films

His Name was Robeson, 1998
Finding of Color. Denis Bouriakov, 1996
Incitatus, 1996
The Moscow Pilgrims, 1995
The First Dean, 1995
The Two, 1994
Good News, 1994
The Russian Pilgrim, 1993
A Christmas Fairy Tale, 1993
Sirin, 1992
Search and You Will Find It, 1992
Zealous Protectress, 1992

Television
Television series aired on REN TV channel:
The Night Is Young, 1997–1998

Design
Malay-Indonesian Studies. Issue XXI
Malay-Indonesian Studies. Issue XX
Malay-Indonesian Studies. Issue XIX
Skorodumova L.G. Mongolian literature of XIX-XX centuries. Questions of poetics
Lena Vladimirova. A Handful of Flying Lines
Sikorsky V. About the Literature and Culture of Indonesia
Nikolay Milovidov. Easter Island

References

External links 

KinoPoisk.ru
Kinorium.ru
RuData.ru
Russian Documentary Guild
Ministry of Culture of the Russian Federation

1963 births
Living people
Mass media people from Moscow
Russian film directors
Russian screenwriters
Russian male film actors
Moscow State University alumni